Latvia–Russia relations are the bilateral foreign relations between Latvia and Russia. Latvia has an embassy in Moscow. Russia has an embassy in Riga.

Both Russia and Latvia are members of UN and OSCE. They have recognized each other since 1991.

History

1920-1940
From 1920 to 1940, relations between the countries had existed. On August 11, 1920, the Republic of Latvia and the Russian Soviet Federal Socialist Republic signed a peace treaty. Article 14 of the Treaty provided for the establishment of diplomatic and consular contacts between the parties upon ratification of the peace treaty. In 1922 USSR had been founded, which took over the foreign affairs of its member states (including Russia).

The Latvian Embassy was located in Moscow from 1920 to 1940. Latvia's first diplomatic representative in Soviet Russia was Ambassador Jānis Vesmanis, who was accredited on 2 November 1920. Latvian consular representations were established during the Civil War period (1919-1920) in Blagoveshchensk and Murmansk. Consular functions were also performed by representatives of the Latvian Interim Government: in Northern Russia by Alfreds Ikners (Archangelsk), in Southern Russia by Kristaps Bahmanis (Kiev) and Rūdolfs Liepiņš (Don and Kuban). From June 1919 to October 1920, Latvia was also represented in Siberia and the Urals by Jānis Mazpolis (Vladivostok).

Soviet period

The Soviet occupation of Latvia in 1940, which included deportations to Siberian Gulags (June deportation), created a large degradation of Latvian-Russian relations. Nazi Germany then occupied Latvia in 1941 German occupation of Latvia during World War II, until the USSR returned in 1944 to resume occupation, resulting in further deportations. During this period many Latvians fled with the retreating Germans or to Sweden.

The Soviet occupation dramatically increased the number of Russians living in Latvia in a short space of time, often replacing those who were deported, executed or had fled. The high influx of Russians and the removal of Latvian as the official language caused further deterioration in the Latvia-Russian relations between citizens.

Relations since 1991

In 1991, Latvia regained independence from the USSR through the Latvian independence and democracy poll, 1991. In 2007, the border treaty between the two states was ratified after Latvia dropped a claim for a small pre-World War II territory that's currently part of modern Russia. While speaking at the Latvia-Russia Business Forum in St. Petersburg, President Valdis Zatlers spoke in favor of a visa free regime between the EU and Russia. In an interview with Latvian newspaper Segodnya, President Andris Berzins stated that the "reality is that Russia is our neighbor, and we need to look for ways to develop good neighborly relations between our two countries no matter what". On December 13, 2018 Latvian parliament adopted a declaration condemning the aggressive actions of Russia in the Kerch Strait incident.

After the 2022 Russian invasion of Ukraine started, Latvia, as one of the EU countries, imposed sanctions on Russia, and Russia added all EU countries to the list of "unfriendly nations". On August 11, Latvian Saeima designated Russia a state sponsor of terrorism.

Withdrawal of Russian troops and the decommissioning of Skrunda-1
Following the dissolution of the Soviet Union, the Russian Federation maintained its military presence in Latvia. It had troops stationed there and it continued to run the Skrunda-1 radar station. As early as 1992 Russia agreed to start withdrawing its troops from Latvia. Following a 30 April 1994 agreement, Latvia allowed Russia to run the Skrunda-1 radar station for four more years in exchange for the full withdrawal of the Russian troops. Russia adhered to this agreement and withdrew its remaining troops from Latvia in August 1994 (except for the troops stationed around Skrunda, who received permission to stay longer). One of the towers of the Skrunda-1 base was demolished with the help of the United States in May 1995. In August 1998, Skrunda-1 suspended operations. Russia eventually dismantled the equipment and withdrew its remaining military personnel the following year. These steps marked a symbolic end to the Russian military presence and World War II on the territory of Latvia.

Diplomatic visits

President Valdis Zatlers attended the Moscow Victory Day Parade on Red Square on 9 May 2010, attending the 65th VE Day celebrations. President Vaira Vīķe-Freiberga previously had attended the 60th anniversary event in 2005. In December 2010, Zatlers made his first state visit to Moscow, with the four-day visit including talks with Russian President Dmitry Medvedev, as well as Prime Minister Vladimir Putin, Moscow Mayor Yuri Luzhkov and Patriarch Kirill of Moscow. The following year, Kremlin Chief of Staff Sergei Naryshkin made a working visit to Latvia.

In early 2014, Latvian President Andris Berzins visited Sochi to attend the 2014 Winter Olympics opening ceremony, where he had a five-minute conversation with Putin.

Controversies and issues of contention

Criticism of alleged violation of minority rights
Russia often criticizes Latvia for alleged discrimination against the Russian-speaking population and has also participated in a number of cases of complaints against Latvia in the European Court of Human Rights as a third party. These cases also dealt with the violation of the rights of the Russian minority in Latvia. Such cases included Slivenko v. Latvia, Kononov v. Latvia, Vikulov and others v. Latvia, Sisojeva And Others v Latvia, and Vasilevskiy v. Latvia.

Spying allegations 
In April 2004 Latvia expelled Second Secretary of the Russian Embassy in Rīga Pyotr Uzhumov, who had allegedly been trying to gather information on Latvia's defence forces, for activities "incompatible with his diplomatic status" to which Russia responded by expelling first secretary of the Latvian Embassy in Moscow.

In March 2018 for activities not consistent with their duties and in solidarity with the United Kingdom's response to the poisoning of Sergei and Yulia Skripal Latvia expelled a second secretary rank Russian diplomat within the Russian embassy in Rīga. Russia responded by expelling a Latvian diplomat from Russia.

In late May 2018 a former employee of Latvian Railways was sentenced to 18 months in prison and 60 hours of community service for espionage. The man had filmed trains carrying NATO equipment and sent the videos to a contact in Russia's Kaliningrad Oblast. In August 2018 a farmer in Alūksne Municipality was given a three-year suspended sentence for collecting open-source information near the Latvian-Russian border at an alleged request of Russian authorities that was classified as espionage.

Attacks on the diplomatic mission 

On the night to May 30, 2014 petards and smoke grenades were thrown at the Latvian general consulate in St. Petersburg by members of The Other Russia party, who set up a USSR flag on the façade of the building, distributed pamphlets and demanded release of their party member Beness Aijo that was detained for incitement to violently overthrow the government of Latvia and change the political system, as well as to liquidate Latvia's national independence. On July 13, 2015 The Latvian consulate in St. Petersburg was once again attacked by members of The Other Russia who threw smoke bombs and eggs at the consulate and distributed flyers, with one activist detained and charged for 'petty hooliganism'.

On the evening of Victory Day on May 9, 2018 smoke grenades and flares were thrown at the Embassy of Latvia in Moscow and two people were detained. The next day the Ministry of Foreign Affairs of Latvia presented a diplomatic note to the Russian authorities, demanded it "to take all precautionary measures to prevent such attacks and to punish the perpetrators" and "ensure repair of the damage", emphasizing that "this is not the first case when the security of the Latvian diplomatic mission in Russia has been exposed to risks".

Effects of the Russo-Ukrainian War 

In September 2022, Poland, Lithuania, Latvia, and Estonia have decided to close entry for Russian citizens with Schengen visas, including those issued by third countries.

Bilateral agreements 
While some agreements have been signed by representatives of Latvia and Russia, not all have been passed by their respective legislatures and are therefore not in force. This list is limited to agreements in force.

 Agreement between the Government of the Republic of Latvia and the Government of the Russian Federation on Cooperation in the Field of Fishery, in force 21 July 1992 (indefinite)
 Agreement between the Republic of Latvia and the Russian Federation on Legal Assistance and Legal Relations in Civil, Family and Criminal Matters, in force 28 March 1995 (indefinite)
 Agreement between the Republic of Latvia and the Russian Federation on Transfer of Sentenced Persons, in force 10 June 1993 (indefinite)
 Agreement between the Government of the Republic of Latvia and the Government of the Russian Federation on Regulation of the Resettlement Process and Protection of the Rights of Resettlers, in force 2 June 1993 (extended twice, now indefinite)
 Agreement between the Government of the Republic of Latvia and the Government of the Russian Federation on Customs Border Posts, in force 24 June 1993 (extended by subsequent protocol which is indefinite)
 Agreement between the Government of the Republic of Latvia and the Government of the Russian Federation in the Field of Communications, in force 2 June 1993 (indefinite)
 Agreement between the Government of the Republic of Latvia and the Government of the Russian Federation on Joint Measures Aimed Toward Exploitation of the Pipeline Situated in the Territory of the Republic of Latvia, in force 2 June 1993 (indefinite)
 Agreement between the Republic of Latvia and the Russian Federation on Legal Status of Radio-location Station Skrunda During Those Provisional Existence and Demontage, adopted 30 Apr 1994 (terminated 21 October 1999)
 Agreement between the Republic of Latvia and the Russian Federation on Terms, Time Limits, Procedure of a Complete Withdrawal of the Armed Forces of the Russian Federation and the Legal Status thereof during Withdrawal from the Territory of Latvia, in force 27 February 1995 (indefinite)
 Agreement between the Government of the Republic of Latvia and the Government of the Russian Federation on Social Protection of Retired Military Personnel of the Russian Federation and their Family Members, Residing on the Territory of Latvia, in force 27 February 1995 (indefinite)
 Agreement between the Government of the Republic of Latvia and the Government of the Russian Federation on Activities of the Authorized Border Agents, in force 14 December 1994 (indefinite)
 Consular Convention between the Republic of Latvia and the Russian Federation, in force 18 May 1997 (indefinite)
 Agreement between the Government of the Republic of Latvia and the Government of the Russian Federation on Mutual Travels of Citizens, in force 18 January 1995 (indefinite)
 Agreement between the Government of the Republic of Latvia and the Government of the Russian Federation on Principles of Cooperation and Conditions of Bilateral Relations in the Field of Transport, in force 14 June 1995 (indefinite)
 Agreement between the Government of the Republic of Latvia and the Government of the Russian Federation on International Road Transport, in force 16 March 1996 (indefinite)
 Agreement between the Government of the Republic of Latvia and the Government of the Russian Federation on Trade Shipping, in force 15 May 1995 (indefinite)
 Agreement between the Government of the Republic of Latvia and the Government of the Russian Federation on Cooperation in the Field of Border Defence, in force 26 February 1996 (indefinite)

Ambassadors

Ambassadors of Latvia in Russia
Jānis Vesmanis (1920–1921; with Soviet Russia)
Jānis Peters (1991–1997)
Imants Daudišs (1997–2001)
Normans Penke (2001–2004)
Andris Teikmanis (2005–2008)
Edgars Skuja (2009–2017)
Māris Riekstiņš (since 2017)

See also 
 Foreign relations of Latvia 
 Foreign relations of Russia 
 Latvia–Russia border 
 Latvia–Ukraine relations
 Russian Latvians

References

External links

  Documents on the Latvia–Russia relationship from the Russian Ministry of Foreign Affairs
  Embassy of Russia in Riga
  Embassy of Latvia in Moscow
 Organization for Security and Co-operation in Europe Representative to the Latvian-Russian Military Pensioners' Commission
List of main claims and recommendations of international organizations and NGO to Latvia as regards rights of national minorities Russian MFA, 2004
  List of treaties
  1991 treaty (not in force)
  2007 border treaty
  2007 treaty on co-operation in the field of social security
 1920 peace treaty

 
Russia
Bilateral relations of Russia